This is a list of country subdivisions by gross domestic product (nominal) per capita in the world, ordered by GDP per capita (from 2008). Entries are limited to those entities exceeding 50,000 U.S. dollars. Those subdivisions which are the largest (in GDP per capita terms) in their respective countries are shown in bold. Figures are shown in U.S. dollars.

List of first-level administrative country subdivisions by nominal GDP per capita

List of EU regions by GDP per capita (nominal) 
List of European regions by their GDP per capita. Figures are in current euros (2008) and United States Dollars of 2010.

Notes

References 
 BEA statistics for 2005 gross state product - October 26, 2006
 U.S. Census Bureau July 1, 2005 population estimates by state - December 22, 2005

First Level Administrative
First Level Administrative
GDP per capita, First Level Administrative